P16.D4 was a German electronic noise music collective, active primarily from 1980 to 1988. P16.D4 embraced tape cut-ups, musique concrète, endless recycling and transformation of previously published material, and many long-distance collaborations with like-minded artists such as DDAA, Vortex Campaign, Nurse With Wound, and Merzbow. Their active participation in the international industrial tape scene yielded collaborative output such as their release Distruct, where bands such as Nurse with Wound, Nocturnal Emissions, Die Tödliche Doris, and The Haters provided the source material. The longest-term collaboration was with the installation and conceptual artist Achim Wollscheid, who used P16.D4 sounds as the basis for LPs he recorded under the name SBOTHI. Ralf Wehowsky, the only constant member of the group, later released solo material under the alias RLW.

Members of P16.D4 were also involved with Selektion, a collective of people involved with sound as well as the visual arts. Selektion published LPs, CDs, books, visual art and design.

Discography

Albums
 Wer Nicht Arbeiten Will Soll Auch Nicht Essen! - 1981
 V.R.N.L. - 1981
 Kühe In 1/2 Trauer (Selektion) - 1982-1983
 Distruct (Selektion) - 1982-1984
 Nichts Niemand Nirgends Nie! (Selektion) - 1985
 Tionchor (Selektion) - 1982-1986
 Acrid Acme (Of) P16.D4 (Selektion) - 1986-1988
 Bruitiste (RRRecords) - 1988
 Fifty (RRRecords) - 1990

Compilations
 Three Projects (Bruitiste - Captured Music - Fifty) (RRRecords) - 1993

References 

German electronic music groups
1980 establishments in West Germany
Musical groups established in 1980
Musical groups disestablished in 1988
Cassette culture 1970s–1990s